Buttah Windee is a small Aboriginal community, located  west of Meekatharra in the Mid-West region of Western Australia, within the Shire of Meekatharra.

Native title 
The community is located within the registered Wajarri Yamatji (WAD6033/98) native title claim area.

Governance 
The community is managed through its incorporated body, Buttah Windee Aboriginal Corporation, incorporated under the Aboriginal Councils and Associations Act 1976 on 16 June 1993.

Town planning 
Buttah Windee Layout Plan No.1 has been prepared in accordance with State Planning Policy 3.2 Aboriginal Settlements. Layout Plan No.1 was endorsed by the community on 21 March 2007 and the Western Australian Planning Commission on 13 November 2007. The Layout Plan map-set and background report are available at the Department of Planning, Lands and Heritage website.

Uranium contamination is a concern in the local water supply. A hydropanel array has been installed to provide safe drinking water.

References

Towns in Western Australia
Aboriginal communities in Mid West (Western Australia)